The 1969 Football Championship of Ukrainian SSR (Class B) was the 39th season of association football competition of the Ukrainian SSR, which was part of the Ukrainian Class B. It was the nineteenth in the Soviet Class B and the seventh season of the Ukrainian Class B. 

The 1969 Football Championship of Ukrainian SSR (Class B) was won by FC Spartak Ivano-Frankivsk.

Zone 1 (West)

Location map

Relegated teams
Two clubs were relegated from the 1968 Second Group (Class A), subgroup 2.
 FC Dnipro Kremenchuk
 FC Avanhard Zhovti Vody

Promoted teams
 FC Budivelnyk Pervomaisk

Relocated and renamed teams
 none

Final standings

Zone 2

Location map

Relegated teams
One club was relegated from the 1968 Second Group (Class A), subgroup 2.
 SKCF Sevastopol

Promoted teams
 FC Avanhard Antratsyt

Relocated and renamed teams
 none

Final standings

Final stage

See also
 Soviet Second League

External links
 1969 season regulations.  Luhansk football portal
 1969 Soviet championships (all leagues) at helmsoccer.narod.ru

1969
3
Soviet
Soviet
class B
class B
Football Championship of the Ukrainian SSR